Jamie Crick (born 1966) is a British radio broadcaster. Formerly a presenter on Classic FM and Encore Radio; he is now associated with Jazz FM. Since March 2019 he has hosted on Scala Radio.

Early life

Born and raised in London, Crick was educated at Christ's School, followed by the University of Westminster where he gained a BA in Communication and Media Studies. Initially working as a presenter for County Sound Radio in Guildford for three years, he then became a presenter/producer for BBC Radio 3.

Classic FM
In 1994 he joined Classic FM and during his 20 years there, he presented a number of programmes for the station, including 'Opera in the Park' and the record attempt to create the world's largest orchestra at the magnificent Symphony Hall in Birmingham. He also presented the Sainsbury’’s Classic FM Youth Orchestra concerts and was a regular contributor of reviews and articles to the Classic FM Magazine. He was best known for presenting the 1-5pm weekday afternoon slot which included Classic FM Requests show.

In September 2014, it was announced at Crick's contract had not been renewed and he departed from the station shortly after.

Jazz FM

In October 2014, Jamie joined Jazz FM, initially as a guest presenter of The Performance Series. He then went on to host the Afternoon Drive slot on the network, from 2pm. and from September 2015 he became the station's breakfast show presenter.

Personal life

Crick's hobbies include music, cycling, football and current affairs.

References

External links
Afternoons with Jamie Crick on Jazz FM
West End Weekend with Jamie Crick on Scala Radio

Living people
British radio DJs
1966 births